Martha MacIsaac (born October 11, 1984) is a Canadian actress. She has appeared in several feature films, including Superbad (2007), The Last House on the Left (2009), Dead Before Dawn (2012), and, most recently, Battle of the Sexes (2017). She has also worked in television and as a voice actress.

Early life
MacIsaac was born and raised in Charlottetown, Prince Edward Island, the youngest of three girls; her mother Irene was one of twelve.

Career
MacIsaac started her career playing Emily Byrd Starr in the Emily of New Moon television series, based on the books by Lucy Maud Montgomery.

She has appeared in several plays including the 2006 play The Wild Duck in which she played Hedwig and was nominated for a Dora Mavor Moore Award for "Outstanding Performance by a Female in a Principal Role - Play". In 2009, she played Paige in a remake of the Wes Craven film The Last House on the Left. She also performed in three consecutive productions of Soulpepper Theatre Company's Our Town as Emily, beginning in 2006.

In a 2007 Entertainment Weekly article, she stated she has been inspired by Julia Roberts from the age of four and was self-described as "obsessed". She also stated she would like to perform alongside her in a film, particularly "a female version of Twins".

In late 2012, MacIsaac began a main role on the NBC comedy 1600 Penn as the president's eldest daughter, Becca. Brittany Snow was originally cast as Becca but because she did not physically resemble and fit in well with the other family members, Martha MacIsaac was cast instead. In a 2012 interview with the CBC Radio series Island Morning, she did reveal that 1600 Penn was her last audition before she considered returning to Canada.

Personal life
She was married to film producer, director and writer Torre Catalano from 2010 to 2015. As of 2013, she lives in Los Angeles.
On December 5, 2018, Martha became engaged to her boyfriend,  Kyle McCullough. They eloped 3 days later. They announced their pregnancy on April 7, 2019 and welcomed their first son, Isaac Kelly McCullough in mid-October 2019.

Filmography

References

External links
 
 About Martha on CBC webpage

1984 births
Actresses from Los Angeles
Canadian child actresses
Canadian film actresses
Canadian television actresses
Canadian voice actresses
Living people
People from Charlottetown
People from Los Angeles
20th-century Canadian actresses
21st-century Canadian actresses
Canadian stage actresses
Canadian expatriate actresses in the United States
Actresses from Prince Edward Island
21st-century American women